The Dancer of the Nile is a 1923 American silent drama film directed by William P.S. Earle and starring Carmel Myers, Malcolm McGregor, and Sam De Grasse. The film was produced in response to the public fascination following the discovery of the tomb of Tutankhamun in November 1922.

Plot
As described in a film magazine review, an Egyptian Princess is infatuated with Karmet, a Syrian prince who is disguised as a merchant. He, however, loves Arvia, a dancer. The Princess plots to sacrifice Arvia to the sacred crocodiles. Arvia is saved by her father and united to Karmet. The princess weds Prince Tut, who afterwards becomes King of Egypt.

Cast

Production
To give the film an authentic historical look, the film used double exposures on detailed paintings with blacked areas where actors would be added, and by filming through transparent painted glass for the background settings. Originally titled Tutankhamen and produced after the discovery of the tomb of Tutankhamun in November 1922, distributors in belief that public interest in the Egyptian king had waned requested a change in the title and plot. As a result, the film was edited to change its focus from Prince Tut to the dancer Arvia.

Preservation
With no copies of The Dancer of the Nile located in any film archives, it is a lost film.

References

Bibliography
 
 
 Munden, Kenneth White (1997). The American Film Institute Catalog of Motion Pictures Produced in the United States, Part 1. University of California Press.

External links

1923 films
1923 drama films
1920s English-language films
American silent feature films
Silent American drama films
American black-and-white films
Film Booking Offices of America films
Films directed by William P. S. Earle
1920s American films